Mark Keller (born 5 May 1965) is a German actor. He is best known as detective André Fux in Alarm für Cobra 11 – Die Autobahnpolizei.

Selected filmography

References

External links 

1965 births
Living people
German male film actors
German male television actors
20th-century German male actors
21st-century German male actors